Thomas Mar Athanasius (Mar Thoma XIV) aka Thomas Thirumeni (7 October 1836 – 10 August 1893) was the Malankara Metropolitan of the autonomous Malankara Syrian Church faction of Malankara, from 1877 to 1893. The first son of prominent Syrian Church reformist Abraham Malpan (the "Martin Luther of the East"), he was born into the Palakunnathu family of Maramon. 
He ascended to the throne of the Malankara Metropolitan at a time of turmoil in the Malankara Church, being removed from office by the majority pro-Patriarchate faction of the church following the Royal court verdict of 1889, and evicted from the Pazhaya seminary (the seat of Malankara Metropolitan). 

The Reformist faction of the Malankara Syrian Church which stood faithful to him later organized into an Independent Reformed Syrian Church governed by its own autocephalous bishop, adopting the name "Malankara Mar Thoma Syrian Church". The Mar Thoma Syrian Church claims to be the true autonomous Malankara Syrian Church dating back to the Apostolic activity of St. Thomas the Apostle in the 1st Century A.D.

History

Early life

Thomas Mar Athanasius, the first son of Abraham Malpan and Aleyamma was born into the Palakunnathu family of Maramon and was the brother of Titus I Mar Thoma Metropolitan. 
His predecessor Mathews Mar Athanasius consecrated Thomas Mar Athanasius of Palakkunnathu Family, as his successor in 1869 in presence of Joseph Mar Koorilose (Alathoorey), Malabar Independent Syrian Church.

Reformation in the Malankara Syrian Church

During the time of Mathews Mar Athanasius, there was a strong uprising in the church for renaissance and reformation inspired by Anglican missionaries and scriptural education; and strong opposition against it led by Mar Dionysius V. Thomas Mar Athanasius, continued the footsteps of his predecessor's reformation policy.

There was no proper Theological education for Clergy, Holy communion was conducted for money, the church buildings belonged to one or two respected families of the parish. There was no proper accounting or auditing of church income or records. Palakkunathu Thomas Mar Athanasious initiated a large number of reforms at Church administration and at the parish level like his predecessor.

Malankara Church was never under any other church. However, the opposition party Pulikkottil Joseph Mar Divaniyos II in 1876, brought the Patriarch of Antioch to preside over the Synod held at Mulanthuruthi. The Patriarch divided Malankara Church into seven dioceses and consecrated bishops for each diocese. Mar Dionysious V was given charge of Quilon dioceses. This helped Mar Dionysius to tighten his hold over the traditional Syrian Church in temporal as well as in spiritual affairs. Palakkunnathu Mathews Mar Athanasious Malankara Metropolitan, his Suffragan Thomas Mar Athanasius metropolitan, and the churches sided with Malankara Metropolitan did not attend the Synod neither agreed to their deliberations. Following the death of Palakkunathu Mathews Mar Athanasious, Palakkunathu Thomas Mar Athanasious became the leader of the reformist faction of the church continued with reformation activities in midst of hostility and eventually it led him into litigation.

The Litigation "Seminary Suit"

The majority Orthodox Jacobite Church represented by Mar Dionysius accused that the consecration of Thomas Mar Athanasius was invalid as it had been done without the permission of the syriac patriarch, held to be the supreme head of the Syrian Church in Malabar. To establish the foothold by the two factions, a litigation, that lasted for 10 years, took place regarding the title to the possession of the ‘Syrian Seminary’ and allied properties of the Church.

In 1889 Royal appeal court, Travancore the final judgment of two native judges decided, the findings in favor of Joseph Mar Dionyasius as representing the Patriarch and the English judge, Mr. Justice Ormsby noted his dissent regarding the judgment. This led to the formation of an independent church. The reformist party in the Syrian church took the name "Malankara Mar Thoma Syrian Church" in 1893.

Malankara Mar Thoma Syrian Church

The Mar Thoma Syrians lost their temporal claim to properties and reorganized themselves as an independent church body. The evangelistic zeal found expression at this time in the formation of the Mar Thoma Evangelistic Association in 1888 and the beginning of the Mar Thoma Church magazine Malankara Sabha Tharaka in 1893.

Both the factions Reformist faction as an Independent Reformed Syrian church and the Traditionalist faction as a part of the Syrian Orthodox church flourished.

Eviction from Malankara Syrian Church

After the litigation, the majority verdict of the Royal Court was against him in 1889. Thomas Mar Athanasius was legally evicted from Kottayam Seminary. This was eviction from the seat of Malankara Metropolitan as he was not consecrated with the consent of Patriarch of Antioch done legally. During the process his Mitre, Cope and Crozier went missing. He led a more prayerful life on then in midst of struggles and was taken to heavenly abode soon after the case.

Though the episcopate of Thomas Mar Athanasius was a period of trial and suffering for the Church, it was also one of great spiritual promise for the future. The Mar Thoma Syrian Church considers itself as one carrying on the original traditions of the Malabar Church, reformed in accordance with the teaching of the Scripture.

Succession

 
 of the Mar Thoma Syrian Church

References

External links
 14th Mar Thoma: His Grace the Most Rev. Thomas Mar Athanasius Metropolitan

Oriental Orthodoxy in India
Metropolitans of the Mar Thoma Syrian Church
Saint Thomas Christians
1836 births
1893 deaths